The 1973 Virginia Slims of Detroit  was a women's tennis tournament played on indoor carpet courts at the Cobo Hall & Arena  in Detroit, Michigan in the United States that was part of the 1973 Virginia Slims World Championship Series. It was the second edition of the tournament and was held from March 1 through March 4, 1973. First-seeded Margaret Court won the singles title and earned $6,000 first-prize money.

Finals

Singles
 Margaret Court defeated  Kerry Melville 7–6(5–4), 6–3

Doubles
 Rosemary Casals /  Billie Jean King defeated  Karen Krantzcke /  Betty Stöve 6–3, 3–6, 6–1

Prize money

References

Virginia Slims of Detroit
Virginia Slims of Detroit
1973 in sports in Michigan
February 1973 sports events in the United States
Virg